Akdere is a small town in Mersin Province, Turkey

Geography 
Akdere is in a rural area of the Silifke district, which itself is a part of the Mersin Province. Akdere is in a narrow valley which runs parallel to the Mediterranean Sea coast. The population is 1,427 as of 2012.

Economy 
The main economic activity in Akdere is agriculture, especially forced crop agriculture.

References 

Populated places in Mersin Province
Towns in Turkey
Populated places in Silifke District